Eslamabad (also Romanized as Eslāmābād; also known as Qal‘eh and Qal‘eh Now) is a village in Julaki Rural District, Jayezan District, Omidiyeh County, Khuzestan Province, Iran. At the 2006 census, its population was 1,720, in 340 families.

References 

Populated places in Omidiyeh County